Seamersville is an unincorporated community within the Township of Jackson, a division of Van Wert County, in the U.S. state of Ohio.

History
A post office called Seamersville was in operation from 1900 until 1903.

References

Unincorporated communities in Van Wert County, Ohio
Unincorporated communities in Ohio
1900 establishments in Ohio